Simon Richard Cox (born 28 April 1987) is a former professional football player and Republic of Ireland international, who played as a striker.

Cox began his career at Reading. He has also played for Brentford, Northampton Town, Swindon Town, West Bromwich Albion, Nottingham Forest and Bristol City. He then returned to Reading for two seasons before his transfer to Southend United on a two-year deal in July 2016. In 2020, Cox joined Western Sydney Wanderers before announcing his retirement in October 2021.

Club career

Early years
Born in the Reading suburb of Tilehurst, he attended Downsway Primary School and Denefield School. Cox joined his home town club, Reading, at the age of nine.

Reading
Cox made his first team debut for Reading on 20 September 2005 in their League Cup victory away at Luton Town, and accepted a professional contract with Reading on 18 November 2005.

On 11 September 2006, Cox went on loan to Brentford. He made five appearances there, including four in League One, before the loan was cut short due to a broken leg suffered against Millwall on 26 September 2006. Cox resumed his loan with Brentford on 22 November 2006 following his recovery from the broken leg, and returned to Reading on 8 January 2007.

His third loan period of the 2006–07 season started on 22 March 2007. This time he joined fellow Reading loanee Alex Pearce at Northampton Town for a month, which was later extended until the end of the season.

On 4 July 2007, Cox signed a new one-year contract to keep him at Reading for the 2007–08 season. On 16 July 2007 Cox scored the only goal of a Peace Cup game against five-time French Champions Olympique Lyonnais.

Cox joined Swindon Town in a six-month loan deal on 31 August 2007. On his return from loan he played in the FA Cup fourth round replay against Tottenham Hotspur on 15 January 2008 at the Madejski Stadium, with the new England manager Fabio Capello in the stands. Cox came on to play right wing in the second half.

Swindon Town
On 31 January 2008, Cox moved to Swindon on a full-time basis. The fee was not disclosed, but was thought to be £150,000. The deal was finalised just three hours before the close of the transfer window. Cox made his debut for Swindon as a permanent signing in a 1–0 defeat away to Huddersfield Town on 9 February 2008. He scored his first goal in the following game, a 3–0 home victory over Cheltenham Town. He went on to score three hat-tricks for Swindon, all away from home, against Hartlepool United, Scunthorpe United and Northampton Town. Cox scored 29 League goals in the 2008–09 season, making him joint top scorer (along with Bristol Rovers' Rickie Lambert) in the top four divisions of English football.

Cox was attracting attention from other clubs, with Swindon expecting bids to come in for the player. Sure enough, in May 2009, Swindon rejected two bids for Cox, one of which was made by Leicester City (the other club being unnamed).

West Bromwich Albion
On 8 July 2009, he signed for West Bromwich Albion, on a two-year contract, for an initial fee of £1.5 million. He made his debut for West Brom exactly a month later, in the opening game of the 2009–10 season, a 1–1 draw at home to Newcastle United (replacing Chris Wood in the 81st minute). He scored his first goal for Albion on 26 August; it was the winner in a 4–3 victory over Rotherham United in the League Cup, coming four minutes from the end of extra time. In his first season at West Brom, he made 34 appearances and scored 10 goals.

In the early weeks of the 2010–11 season, following Albion's promotion, Cox was restricted to two substitute appearances in the Premier League and started only in the League Cup. He scored the winning goal in a 2–1 victory over Manchester City in the third round, and in the fourth round he scored two goals in a 4–1 win over Leicester City. He was rewarded with his first Premier League start in Albion's next game, on 1 November 2010, against Blackpool, but he was substituted in the 12th minute after West Brom had a player sent off. Albion lost the match 2–1. He scored his first Premier League goal against Tottenham Hotspur on 23 April 2011 – an 81st-minute equaliser, just four minutes after replacing Paul Scharner. The goal was featured as one of BBC Match of the Day's goals of the month. Cox started each of Albion's next three Premier League games, taking a more creative position behind the main striker. During the 2011–12 season, Cox was not a first team regular and, in April 2012, Cox says he wanted talks with the club about his future in the summer.

Nottingham Forest
On 11 August 2012, Cox joined Nottingham Forest for an undisclosed fee, signing a three-year contract. The transfer fee was reported to be £2 million. He became Forest's seventh signing in the summer transfer window. Cox scored his first goal for the club in the 1–1 draw away against Huddersfield Town on 21 August 2012. He scored his second goal in a 4–1 defeat in League Cup against Premier League club Wigan Athletic with a strike described by the Daily Express as 'spectacular'. This goal took his tally to 2 goals and 2 assists in his first 4 appearances for Forest. On Saturday 15 September, Cox came off the bench to show wonderful technique with an outstanding first touch and lobbed finish past Birmingham City keeper Jack Butland. On 27 October, Cox bagged his 3rd goal for the club in a clinical 4–1 win away at Barnsley. Striker, Cox, ended a run of 26 games without a goal for club and country, when he struck against Leicester on Saturday 4 May. It was only his fifth League goal of the season, despite being ever present in Nottingham Forest's unsuccessful bid to reach the play-offs.

Cox started the first game of the 2013–14 season against Huddersfield Town, however picked up an injury in the second: a Football League Cup first round win over Hartlepool United.

Return to Reading
On 7 August 2014, Cox was officially unveiled as Reading's first signing of the season. The signing saw Cox return to the club  where he spent his youth and the start of his professional career. Cox signed for £600k on a two-year contract. Cox scored his first goal for Reading against Huddersfield Town.

On 9 October 2015, Cox joined Championship rivals Bristol City on loan until the beginning of January 2016. On 2 January 2016, following Bristol City's defeat to Reading, they confirmed the Cox had returned to his parent club.

Reading announced on 9 May 2016, that Cox would leave Reading when his contract expired at the end of June 2016.

Southend United
On 16 July 2016, Southend United announced the signing of Cox on a two-year deal after he committed his future to the Shrimpers until at least the summer of 2018.

Southend United's Phil Brown is quoted as saying "Signing someone of Simon's pedigree is fantastic, we have been working long & hard towards this signing and I can't thank the Chairman enough for pushing this through, it's a real coup for the Club".

Cox scored his first goal for the club in a 3–0 win away at Sheffield United on 16 August 2016.

On 26 June 2018, Cox signed a new contract at Southend

Western Sydney Wanderers
On 16 January 2020, Western Sydney Wanderers signed Cox to play in the A-League, joining on a one-and-half-year deal.

On 15 October 2021, Cox announced his retirement from professional football, and his desire to move into coaching and management.

International career
Cox is eligible to play for the Republic of Ireland through his Irish-born grandmother. He was first called up to the Republic of Ireland squad by Giovanni Trapattoni on 5 May 2011, as a replacement for Damien Duff. Cox made his international debut on 24 May 2011 in the 2011 Nations Cup game against Northern Ireland, when he scored the fifth goal in a 5–0 victory. He went on to win four caps in the next two weeks, and scored his second international goal in a 2–0 friendly defeat of Italy in Liège on 7 June 2011. On 11 October 2011, he played and received the "Man of the Match" award in the game against Armenia, helping secure his team a place in the play-offs  for UEFA Euro 2012. While there was some controversy over his goal,replays clearly showed the ball touched his chest and never touched his hands.  He scored the equaliser in the 1–1 friendly against the Czech Republic at the Aviva Stadium on 29 February 2012. Cox was selected in Trapattoni's 23-man squad for the UEFA Euro 2012. Cox scored his 4th goal for Ireland in a 4–0 win over Georgia on 2 June 2013. On 6 September 2013, after coming as a second-half substitute in a World Cup qualification match against Sweden, it was supposed that he has suffered a dead leg and would battle for fitness. However, Cox's club, Forest, denied any such allegation.

Career statistics

Club

International

Scores and results list the Republic of Ireland's goal tally first, score column indicates score after each Cox goal.

Honours
Republic of Ireland
Nations Cup: 2011

Individual
Swindon Town Player of the Season: 2008–09

See also
 List of Republic of Ireland international footballers born outside the Republic of Ireland

References

External links

 Simon Cox profile at the West Bromwich Albion website
 
 
 FAI Profile

1987 births
Living people
Sportspeople from Reading, Berkshire
English footballers
Republic of Ireland association footballers
Republic of Ireland international footballers
Association football forwards
Reading F.C. players
Brentford F.C. players
Northampton Town F.C. players
Swindon Town F.C. players
West Bromwich Albion F.C. players
Nottingham Forest F.C. players
Southend United F.C. players
Western Sydney Wanderers FC players
Premier League players
English Football League players
UEFA Euro 2012 players
English people of Irish descent
Footballers from Berkshire